Siri Lynn Mullinix (born May 22, 1978) is an American retired soccer goalkeeper. As keeper for the 2000 U.S. women's Olympic soccer team, she recorded two shutouts helping the team win the silver medal. In 2010, Mullinix was inducted into the North Carolina Soccer Hall of Fame.

College career
In her four years with the University of North Carolina, she played 90 games earning 43 shutouts and a goals against average of 0.27. She was named the Defensive MVP in the 1997 NCAA tournament where she earned a 120-minute shutout in the final against Notre Dame. In her four years with the UNC Tar Heels, the team won the ACC title four times and the NCAA title twice.

National team
Her first start with the U.S. women's national team came in a game against Japan in Atlanta on May 2, 1999. She recorded her first national team shutout on March 12, 2000, against Portugal. In her national team career, she played in 29 games with 28 starts. She set a team record by earning 15 shutouts in 2000 for an 18-5-5 record and a 0.60 goals against average. Mullinix won the silver medal in women's football as a member of the U.S. team at the 2000 Summer Olympics.

Professional career
At the launch of the Women's United Soccer Association in 2001, Mullinix was allocated to the Washington Freedom where she won 5 of her 18 starts that inaugural season. She won 7 games in the 2002 season and led the league in save percentage that year (80.8%). She played in the league championship game in 2002 and won it in 2003 when she was also named to the WUSA All-Star team. Mullinix and teammate Mia Hamm were the first inductees into the Washington Freedom's "Hall of Freedom".

Coaching career
On May 23, 2005, Mullinix was named assistant coach under Eddie Radwanski for the UNC Greensboro women's soccer team. In 2009, she became the goalkeeping coach for the Virginia Commonwealth University women's team while also enrolling as a student. After three years at VCU she rejoined Radwanski as an assistant coach at Clemson.  On August 15, 2014, Mullinix was named in a lawsuit by Haley Ellen Hunt related to an alleged hazing incident on August 18, 2011. In early 2016, the lawsuit was dismissed.

References

1978 births
Living people
American women's soccer players
United States women's international soccer players
Washington Freedom players
North Carolina Tar Heels women's soccer players
Virginia Commonwealth University alumni
Footballers at the 2000 Summer Olympics
Women's association football goalkeepers
Medalists at the 2000 Summer Olympics
Olympic silver medalists for the United States in soccer
UNC Greensboro Spartans women's soccer coaches
VCU Rams women's soccer coaches
Clemson Tigers women's soccer coaches
American soccer coaches
2003 FIFA Women's World Cup players
Soccer players from Denver
Sportspeople from Greensboro, North Carolina
Soccer players from North Carolina
Raleigh Wings players
USL W-League (1995–2015) players
Women's United Soccer Association players